Sébastian Ugeux (born 29 September 1970) is a Belgian race car driver who raced two races of the 2001 FIA Sportscar Championship season for the Lucchini Engineering team.  He later raced in the 2005 Le Mans Series season for Scuderia Villorba Corse, who also used a Lucchini chassis. His grandfather was Pierre Ugeux, former President of the Commission Sportive Internationale (CSI), which oversaw all Formula One sporting regulations.

External links

Living people
Belgian racing drivers
Belgian motorsport people
European Le Mans Series drivers
24 Hours of Spa drivers
1970 births